Heba Shibani is a war correspondent, film producer and women's rights activist from Libya.

Career 
Shibani has worked for a variety of news outlets, including Reuters, Libya TV, Alassema TV, and Alnabaa News TV. For Alhan Libiyya, she produced the series Lahni, which explores the diversity of music in Libya. She has produced television programmes on women's rights in Libya. She reported on the situation some Libyan women were facing, where their children were due to be deported, since Libyan law did not allow women to pass their citizenship to their children. She was forced to flee Libya in 2014, due to her journalism. She is one of nineteen women reporters whose essays on their work were published in 2019 in the volume Our Women on the Ground.

References

External links 
 British Council Hammamet Conference 2014 Heba Shibani
 Heba Shibani website

Living people
Libyan journalists
War correspondents
Libyan women activists
Television producers
Libyan women journalists
Year of birth missing (living people)